Stepnoy Kuchuk is a rural locality (a selo) and the administrative center of Stepno-Kuchuksky Selsoviet, Rodinsky District, Altai Krai, Russia. The population was 1,040 as of 2013. There are 7 streets.

Geography 
Stepnoy Kuchuk is located on the Kuchuk River, 16 km northeast of Rodino (the district's administrative centre) by road. Stepnoye is the nearest rural locality.

References 

Rural localities in Rodinsky District